Parliamentary votes on Brexit, sometimes referred to as "meaningful votes", were the parliamentary votes under the terms of Section 13 of the United Kingdom's European Union (Withdrawal) Act 2018, which requires the government of the United Kingdom to bring forward an amendable parliamentary motion at the end of the Article 50 negotiations between the government and the European Union in order to ratify the Brexit withdrawal agreement.

The wording of the clause was strongly contested by both the House of Commons and the House of Lords, with the Lords proposing an amendment to the bill giving further powers to parliament. When the bill returned to the Commons the Conservative government offered concessions and the Lords' proposed amendment was defeated. The bill was then passed into law on 26 June 2018.

By the end of March 2019, the government had not won any of the meaningful votes. This led to a series of non-binding "indicative votes" on potential options for Brexit, and the delay of the departure date until after the 2019 general election.

History

Background 
Following the UK's decision to leave the European Union, the result of a referendum on 23 June 2016, the UK government invoked Article 50 of the Treaty on the European Union. The UK was thus due to leave the EU at 11pm on 29 March 2019 UTC.

Gina Miller, a British businesswoman, took the government to court to challenge its authority to invoke Article 50 without reference to Parliament. On 3 November 2016, the High Court of Justice ruled in favour of Miller in the case R (Miller) v Secretary of State for Exiting the European Union.

In January 2017 the Conservative Prime Minister Theresa May announced, "I can confirm today that the Government will put the final deal that is agreed between the UK and the EU to a vote in both Houses of Parliament, before it comes into force." As a result, on 13 July 2017, David Davis, the Secretary of State for Exiting the European Union, introduced the bill in the Commons, including the following clause 9 statement:
9Implementing the withdrawal agreement
(1)A Minister of the Crown may by regulations make such provision as the Minister considers appropriate for the purposes of implementing the withdrawal agreement if the Minister considers that such provision should be in force on or before exit day.

As a government bill, this first reading was pro forma, with the first debate taking place on the second reading.

On 18 April 2017 Theresa May announced a snap general election for 8 June 2017, with the aim of strengthening her hand in Brexit negotiations. This resulted in a hung parliament, in which the number of Conservative seats fell from 330 to 317, despite the party winning its highest vote share since 1983, prompting her to broker a confidence and supply deal with the Democratic Unionist Party (DUP) to support a minority government.

In July 2017 David Jones, Minister of State for Exiting the European Union, told the Commons he expected the parliamentary vote on the Brexit deal with the EU to happen "before the European Parliament debates and votes on the final agreement." Asked to clarify what would happen if MPs and members of the House of Lords decide they don't like the deal, Jones said "the vote will be either to accept the deal. Or there will be no deal." At an Exiting the European Union Select Committee meeting in October, Labour MP Seema Malhotra asked Davis, "The vote of our parliament, the UK parliament, could be after March 2019?", to which Davis replied, "Yes, it could be." This drew criticism from Labour opposition MPs and some Conservative MPs.

Alteration of Clause 9 
In December 2017 pressure grew on the government to amend clause 9 so that parliament would have approval of the final terms of the withdrawal deal between the UK and the EU prior to 29 March 2019, the date set for the UK's departure from the EU. Conservative MP Dominic Grieve advised the government to amend the clause themselves or he would table his own amendment to the bill. Grieve duly tabled his amendment to the bill (Amendment 7) requiring any Brexit deal to be enacted by statute, rather than implemented by government order.

Clause 9 was then introduced to the house as follows (Grieve's additions, amendment 7, in italics):
9Implementing the withdrawal agreement
(1)A Minister of the Crown may by regulations make such provision as the Minister considers appropriate for the purposes of implementing the withdrawal agreement if the Minister considers that such provision should be in force on or before exit day, subject to the prior enactment of a statute by Parliament approving the final terms of withdrawal of the United Kingdom from the European Union.
(2)Regulations under this section may make any provision that could be made by an Act of Parliament (including modifying this Act).
(3)But regulations under this section may not—
(a)impose or increase taxation,
(b)make retrospective provision,
(c)create a relevant criminal offence, or
(d)amend, repeal or revoke the Human Rights Act 1998 or any subordinate legislation made under it.
(4)No regulations may be made under this section after exit day.

At the weekend prior to the Commons vote on the amendment, the leaders of the all-party parliamentary group on EU relations signed a statement saying, "Members of all parties have already provided valuable scrutiny to the EU (Withdrawal) bill, and we have forced the government into some concessions. But little of that will matter unless we can have a truly meaningful vote on the withdrawal agreement the government negotiates with the European Union."

On the morning of 13 December 2017 Davis issued a written statement saying, "In the UK, the Government has committed to hold a vote on the final deal in Parliament as soon as possible after the negotiations have concluded. This vote will take the form of a resolution in both Houses of Parliament and will cover both the Withdrawal Agreement and the terms for our future relationship."

Later that day, at Prime Minister's Questions, the Conservative MP Anna Soubry requested that May accept Grieve's amendment, "The Prime Minister says that she wants a meaningful vote on Brexit before we leave the European Union. Even at this last moment, will she be so good as to accept my right hon. and learned Friend’s [Grieve's] amendment 7, in the spirit of unity for everybody here and in the country?" May rejected the idea, saying "We were very clear that we will not commence any statutory instruments until that meaningful vote has taken place, but as currently drafted [Grieve's draft] what the amendment says is that we should not put any of those arrangements and statutory instruments into place until the withdrawal agreement and implementation Bill has reached the statute book. That could be at a very late stage in the proceedings, which could mean we are not able to have the orderly and smooth exit from the European Union that we wish to have."

That evening, Grieve's amendment was passed by 309 votes to 305 votes – a majority of 4, representing a defeat for the government. Twelve Conservative MPs voted against the government: Grieve, Soubry, Heidi Allen, Kenneth Clarke, Jonathan Djanogly, Stephen Hammond, Oliver Heald, Nicky Morgan, Bob Neill, Antoinette Sandbach, John Stevenson and Sarah Wollaston. A month earlier, all but Stevenson were pictured along with fellow Conservative MPs Vicky Ford, Jeremy Lefroy, Paul Masterton and Tom Tugendhat on the front page of the Daily Telegraph describing them as "The Brexit Mutineers".

House of Lords Report Stage 

At the House of Lords Report Stage in April 2018, Viscount Hailsham introduced a new clause as follows:

Before Clause 9, insert the following new Clause—

nParliamentary approval of the outcome of negotiations with the European Union

(1)Without prejudice to any other statutory provision relating to the withdrawal agreement, Her Majesty’s Government may conclude such an agreement only if a draft has been—
(a)approved by a resolution of the House of Commons, and
(b)subject to the consideration of a motion in the House of Lords.
(2)So far as practicable, a Minister of the Crown must make arrangements for the resolution provided for in subsection (1)(a) to be debated and voted on before the European Parliament has debated and voted on the draft withdrawal agreement.
(3)Her Majesty’s Government may implement a withdrawal agreement only if Parliament has approved the withdrawal agreement and any transitional measures agreed within or alongside it by an Act of Parliament.
(4)Subsection (5) applies in each case that any of the conditions in subsections (6) to (8) is met.
(5)Her Majesty’s Government must follow any direction in relation to the negotiations under Article 50(2) of the Treaty on European Union which has been—
(a)approved by a resolution of the House of Commons, and
(b)subject to the consideration of a motion in the House of Lords.
(6)The condition in this subsection is that the House of Commons has not approved the resolution required under subsection (1)(a) by 30 November 2018.
(7)The condition in this subsection is that the Act of Parliament required under subsection (3) has not received Royal Assent by 31 January 2019.
(8)The condition in this subsection is that no withdrawal agreement has been reached between the United Kingdom and the European Union by 28 February 2019.
(9)In this section, "withdrawal agreement" means an agreement (whether or not ratified) between the United Kingdom and the EU under Article 50(2) of the Treaty on European Union which sets out the arrangements for the United Kingdom’s withdrawal from the EU and the framework for the United Kingdom’s future relationship with the European Union."

The amendment with the new clause was passed by Lords by 335 to 244 – a majority of 91, which represented a further defeat for the government. The new wording would have given MPs the power to stop the UK from leaving the EU without a deal, or to make Theresa May return to negotiations.

Commons consideration of the Lords amendment 
The government rejected the proposal by the Lords that would give the Commons the power to decide the next steps for the government if the withdrawal agreement were to be rejected by parliament.

Labour MP Keir Starmer urged Conservative MPs who want Britain to remain in the EU to vote with Labour in favour of the Lords amendment when the bill returned to the Commons, and former Labour Prime Minister Gordon Brown suggested that May could be replaced by a new Tory Prime Minister if she lost the vote. The prominent Tory remainer Amber Rudd urged her party's MPs to back the government in the vote.

The process of parliamentary ping-pong then took place between 12 and 20 June 2018.

Alternative amendment by Dominic Grieve 
The night before the bill was due back before the Commons, 11 June 2018, Dominic Grieve tabled a last-minute alternative amendment. The Lords amendment would prevent a 'no deal' scenario, and MPs and Lords could tell May to go back to the negotiating table and get something better, for example. Grieve's amendment also tackled the 'no deal' scenario but it set dates for May to come back to parliament and set out the government's intentions in the event of a 'no deal', and gain parliamentary approval for those plans.

Grieve's amendment:

(5A)Within seven days of a statement under subsection (4) being laid, a Minister of the Crown must move a motion in the House of Commons to seek approval of the Government’s approach.
(5B)In the event of no political agreement having been reached on a withdrawal agreement by the end of 30 November 2018, a Minister of the Crown must move a motion in the House of Commons setting out how the Government intends to proceed and seeking the approval of the House for that course of action.
(5C)If no political agreement has been reached on a withdrawal agreement by the end of 15 February 2019, the Government must bring the matter before both Houses of Parliament within five days and must follow any direction in relation to the negotiations under Article 50(2) of the Treaty of European Union which has been—
(a)approved by a resolution of the House of Commons, and
(b)the subject of a motion which has either been debated in the House of Lords, or upon which the House of Lords has not concluded a debate on the motion before the end of the period of five sitting days beginning with the first sitting day after the day on which the House of Commons passes the resolution mentioned in paragraph (a).

Commons rejection of Grieve's amendment 
On the morning of the vote, 12 June 2018, the government rejected the alternative amendment by Grieve. This set the scene for disagreement during the Commons debate about whether or not parliament should have a say in the event of the UK leaving the EU without a deal. The morning also saw Phillip Lee's surprise resignation as a junior Tory minister saying, "If, in the future, I am to look my children in the eye and honestly say that I did my best for them I cannot, in all good conscience, support how our country’s current exit from the EU looks set to be delivered."

As the debate went on, the government gave assurances to potential Tory rebels that they would address their concerns in a new amendment for the Lords to consider. The concession offered by ministers was believed to include offering a new parliamentary motion if the Brexit deal was voted down by MPs and peers, which would open the door to MPs taking control of the negotiations if ministers failed to strike a deal in Brussels. The concession meant that the government won 324 votes to 298, a majority of 26.

Aftermath of the Commons rejection of Grieve's amendment 
On the BBC's Newsnight, Grieve said that May must honour "assurances" she's given that Parliament will get a bigger say on any final Brexit deal. There was disagreement among Tories over what had been agreed, with Anna Soubry MP saying that, "the PM said yesterday that clause c of Dominic Grieve's amendment would be discussed as part of the new amendment to be tabled in the Lords", and Stephen Hammond MP writing, "Parliament must be able to have its say in a 'no deal' situation and we made this point very strongly today to the Government. The Government has conceded this point and I expect to see a new amendment to cover this situation soon."

A spokesperson for Downing Street claimed that the prime minister had agreed only to ongoing discussions, and Davis's Brexit department issued a statement which read: "We have not, and will not, agree to the House of Commons binding the Government’s hands in the negotiations." Tory MP Andrew Bridgen accused Tory remainers supportive of Grieve's amendment to the Brexit bill of deliberatively attempting to stop the UK leaving the EU completely.

Speaking the day after the vote, in the Commons at Prime Minister's Questions, May said, "We have seen concerns raised about the role of Parliament in relation to the Brexit process. What I agreed yesterday is that, as the Bill goes back to the Lords, we will have further discussions with colleagues over those concerns. This morning, I have agreed with the Brexit Secretary that we will bring forward an amendment in the Lords, and there are a number of things that will guide our approach in doing so... As my right hon. friend the Brexit Secretary made clear in the House yesterday, the Government’s hand in the negotiations cannot be tied by Parliament, but the Government must be accountable to Parliament. Government determines policy, and we then need parliamentary support to be able to implement that policy." Commenting, the BBC's Laura Kuenssberg said "The risk is that appears as double dealing."

Government's proposed amendment 
On the evening of 14 June 2018 the government published its compromise amendment:

(5A)A Minister of the Crown must make arrangements for - 
(a)a motion in neutral terms, to the effect that the House of Commons has considered the matter of the statement mentioned in subsection (4), to be moved in that House by a Minister of the Crown within the period of 7 Commons sitting days beginning with the day on which the statement is made, and
(b)a motion for the House of Lords to take note of the statement to be moved in that House by a Minister of the Crown within the period of 7 Lords sitting days beginning with the day on which the statement is made.

(5B)Subsection (5C) applies if the Prime Minister makes a statement before the end of 21 January 2019 that no agreement can be reached in negotiations under Article 50(2) of the Treaty on European Union on the substance of -
(a)the arrangements for the United Kingdom's withdrawal from the EU, and 
(b)the framework for the future relationship between the EU and the United Kingdom after withdrawal.

(5C)A Minister of the Crown must, within a period of 14 days beginning with the day on which the statement mentioned in subsection (5B) is made -
(a)make a statement setting out how Her Majesty's Government proposes to proceed, and
(b)make arrangements for - 
(i)a motion in neutral terms, to the effect that the House of Commons has considered the statement mentioned in paragraph (a), to be moved in that House by a Minister of the Crown within a period of 7 Commons sitting days beginning with the day on which the statement mentioned in paragraph (a) is made, and
(ii)a motion for the House of Lords to take note of the statement mentioned in paragraph (a) to be moved in that House by a Minister of the Crown within the period of 7 Lords sitting days beginning with the day on which the statement mentioned in paragraph (a) is made.

, rebel Tory MPs were reportedly still unhappy with the amendment as it only allows the Commons "a motion in neutral terms" (5C)(b)(i). Grieve had originally wanted the amendment to say that the government must seek the approval of Parliament for its course of action, and that ministers must be directed by MPs and peers.

Re-tabling of Grieve’s amendment 

On the evening of 14 June 2018 Viscount Hailsham, who proposed the original amendment on the meaningful vote, re-tabled Grieve's amendment under his own name in the Lords in full. Speaking on the Sunday Politics programme, ahead of the amendment returning to the Lords, Grieve said, "The alternative is that we've all got to sign up to a slavery clause now saying, 'Whatever the government does when it comes to January, however potentially catastrophic it might be for my constituents and my country, I'm signing in blood now that I will follow over the edge of the cliff', and that, I can tell you, I am not prepared to do." Speaking on the same programme, the Solicitor General, Conservative MP Robert Buckland, replied, "If you were Michel Barnier and you were looking into the negotiation and looking into the future, it gives him a bit of a trump card to play when he knows that whatever the UK government might be saying to him now, he knows that at the end of it there's a third-party in this relationship, namely parliament, who are going to get involved and trump whatever the UK government say. Now that's not a good place for David Davis to be in. David Davis needs to be able to go out there and have a firm negotiating hand..."

On 18 June Lord Hailsham's amendment was passed by the Lords, a defeat for the government by 354 votes to 235: a majority of 119.

When the bill returned to the Commons on 20 June the government offered further concessions. The concessions meant that the government won by 319 votes to 303: a majority of 16.

Grieve said afterwards: "We’ve managed to reach a compromise without breaking the government – and I think some people don't realise we were getting quite close to that. I completely respect the view of my colleagues who disagree, but if we can compromise we can achieve more."

Full text 

13Parliamentary approval of the outcome of negotiations with the EU

(1)The withdrawal agreement may be ratified only if—

(a)a Minister of the Crown has laid before each House of Parliament—

(i)a statement that political agreement has been reached,

(ii)a copy of the negotiated withdrawal agreement, and

(iii)a copy of the framework for the future relationship,

(b)the negotiated withdrawal agreement and the framework for the future relationship have been approved by a resolution of the House of Commons on a motion moved by a Minister of the Crown,

(c)a motion for the House of Lords to take note of the negotiated withdrawal agreement and the framework for the future relationship has been tabled in the House of Lords by a Minister of the Crown and—

(i)the House of Lords has debated the motion, or

(ii)the House of Lords has not concluded a debate on the motion before the end of the period of five Lords sitting days beginning with the first Lords sitting day after the day on which the House of Commons passes the resolution mentioned in paragraph (b), and

(d)an Act of Parliament has been passed which contains provision for the implementation of the withdrawal agreement.

(2)So far as practicable, a Minister of the Crown must make arrangements for the motion mentioned in subsection (1)(b) to be debated and voted on by the House of Commons before the European Parliament decides whether it consents to the withdrawal agreement being concluded on behalf of the EU in accordance with Article 50(2) of the Treaty on European Union.

(3)Subsection (4) applies if the House of Commons decides not to pass the resolution mentioned in subsection (1)(b).

(4)A Minister of the Crown must, within the period of 21 days beginning with the day on which the House of Commons decides not to pass the resolution, make a statement setting out how Her Majesty's Government proposes to proceed in relation to negotiations for the United Kingdom's withdrawal from the EU under Article 50(2) of the Treaty on European Union.

(5)A statement under subsection (4) must be made in writing and be published in such manner as the Minister making it considers appropriate.

(6)A Minister of the Crown must make arrangements for—

(a)a motion in neutral terms, to the effect that the House of Commons has considered the matter of the statement mentioned in subsection (4), to be moved in that House by a Minister of the Crown within the period of seven Commons sitting days beginning with the day on which the statement is made, and

(b)a motion for the House of Lords to take note of the statement to be moved in that House by a Minister of the Crown within the period of seven Lords sitting days beginning with the day on which the statement is made.

(7)Subsection (8) applies if the Prime Minister makes a statement before the end of 21 January 2019 that no agreement in principle can be reached in negotiations under Article 50(2) of the Treaty on European Union on the substance of—

(a)the arrangements for the United Kingdom's withdrawal from the EU, and

(b)the framework for the future relationship between the EU and the United Kingdom after withdrawal.

(8)A Minister of the Crown must, within the period of 14 days beginning with the day on which the statement mentioned in subsection (7) is made—

(a)make a statement setting out how Her Majesty's Government proposes to proceed, and

(b)make arrangements for—

(i)a motion in neutral terms, to the effect that the House of Commons has considered the matter of the statement mentioned in paragraph (a), to be moved in that House by a Minister of the Crown within the period of seven Commons sitting days beginning with the day on which the statement mentioned in paragraph (a) is made, and

(ii)a motion for the House of Lords to take note of the statement mentioned in paragraph (a) to be moved in that House by a Minister of the Crown within the period of seven Lords sitting days beginning with the day on which the statement mentioned in paragraph (a) is made.

(9)A statement under subsection (7) or (8)(a) must be made in writing and be published in such manner as the Minister making it considers appropriate.

(10)Subsection (11) applies if, at the end of 21 January 2019, there is no agreement in principle in negotiations under Article 50(2) of the Treaty on European Union on the substance of—

(a)the arrangements for the United Kingdom's withdrawal from the EU, and

(b)the framework for the future relationship between the EU and the United Kingdom after withdrawal.

(11)A Minister of the Crown must, within the period of five days beginning with the end of 21 January 2019—

(a)make a statement setting out how Her Majesty's Government proposes to proceed, and

(b)make arrangements for—

(i)a motion in neutral terms, to the effect that the House of Commons has considered the matter of the statement mentioned in paragraph (a), to be moved in that House by a Minister of the Crown within the period of five Commons sitting days beginning with the end of 21 January 2019, and

(ii)a motion for the House of Lords to take note of the statement mentioned in paragraph (a) to be moved in that House by a Minister of the Crown within the period of five Lords sitting days beginning with the end of 21 January 2019.

(12)A statement under subsection (11)(a) must be made in writing and be published in such manner as the Minister making it considers appropriate

(13)For the purposes of this section—

(a)a statement made under subsection (4), (8)(a) or (11)(a) may be combined with a statement made under another of those provisions,

(b)a motion falling within subsection (6)(a), (8)(b)(i) or (11)(b)(i) may be combined into a single motion with another motion falling within another of those provisions, and

(c)a motion falling within subsection (6)(b), (8)(b)(ii) or (11)(b)(ii) may be combined into a single motion with another motion falling within another of those provisions.

(14)This section does not affect the operation of Part 2 of the Constitutional Reform and Governance Act 2010 (ratification of treaties) in relation to the withdrawal agreement.

(15)In subsection (1) "framework for the future relationship" means the document or documents identified, by the statement that political agreement has been reached, as reflecting the agreement in principle on the substance of the framework for the future relationship between the EU and the United Kingdom after withdrawal.

(16)In this section—

"Commons sitting day" means a day on which the House of Commons is sitting (and a day is only a day on which the House of Commons is sitting if the House begins to sit on that day);

"Lords sitting day" means a day on which the House of Lords is sitting (and a day is only a day on which the House of Lords is sitting if the House begins to sit on that day);

"negotiated withdrawal agreement" means the draft of the withdrawal agreement identified by the statement that political agreement has been reached;

"ratified", in relation to the withdrawal agreement, has the same meaning as it does for the purposes of Part 2 of the Constitutional Reform and Governance Act 2010 in relation to a treaty (see section 25 of that Act);

"statement that political agreement has been reached" means a statement made in writing by a Minister of the Crown which—
(a)states that, in the Minister's opinion, an agreement in principle has been reached in negotiations under Article 50(2) of the Treaty on European Union on the substance of—

(i)arrangements for the United Kingdom's withdrawal from the EU, and

(ii)the framework for the future relationship between the EU and the United Kingdom after withdrawal,

(b)identifies a draft of the withdrawal agreement which, in the Minister's opinion, reflects the agreement in principle so far as relating to the arrangements for withdrawal, and

(c)identifies one or more documents which, in the Minister's opinion, reflect the agreement in principle so far as relating to the framework.

'Plan B' amendment 
At the end of November 2018, May presented the draft agreement on a future relationship with Europe to the Commons after closing a 17-month negotiation with the EU. Consequently, the first use of the meaningful vote was scheduled for 11 December 2018.

If the UK parliament were to vote against the deal then the government would need to present an alternative, a 'Plan B'. As a result, Grieve tabled an amendment to the business motion addressing the procedure in the event parliament votes down the deal. The amendment states (change in italics):

(11)A Minister of the Crown must, within the period of five days beginning with the end of 21 January 2019—

(a)make a statement setting out how Her Majesty's Government proposes to proceed, and

(b)make arrangements for—

(i)a motion in neutral terms, to the effect that the House of Commons has considered the matter of the statement mentioned in paragraph (a), to be moved in that House by a Minister of the Crown within the period of five Commons sitting days beginning with the end of 21 January 2019, and

(ii)a motion for the House of Lords to take note of the statement mentioned in paragraph (a) to be moved in that House by a Minister of the Crown within the period of five Lords sitting days beginning with the end of 21 January 2019.

The provisions of Standing Order No. 24B (Amendments to motions to consider specified matters) shall not apply in respect of any motion tabled by a Minister of the Crown pursuant to any provision of section 13 of the European Union (Withdrawal) Act 2018.

Standing Order No. 24B states: "Where, in the opinion of the Speaker... a motion... is expressed in neutral terms, no amendments to it may be tabled. Grieve’s amendment disapplies this Standing Order to any motion moved under the meaningful vote section of the Act, which would make any motion relating to the withdrawal process amendable by parliament.

The success of Grieve's amendment (passed 321 votes to 299) means MPs can now change that motion, giving them far greater say over the UK's exit from the EU.

"Three-day" amendment 
Section 13 of the 2018 Act provides that:
(1)The withdrawal agreement may be ratified only if—
(b)the negotiated withdrawal agreement and the framework for the future relationship have been approved by a resolution of the House of Commons on a motion moved by a Minister of the Crown.

On 4 December 2018 the government tabled a business motion to set out the timetable for the meaningful vote, as required by S13(1)(b), with the vote scheduled for 11 December 2018.

 
That the following provisions shall have effect.
Sitting arrangements
(1)In this Order—
‘European Union withdrawal motion’ means a motion in the name of a Minister of the Crown under section 13(1)(b) of the European Union (Withdrawal) Act 2018; and ‘allotted day’ means a day on which the first Government business is the European Union withdrawal motion.
(2)The allotted days shall be Tuesday 4 December, Wednesday 5 December, Thursday 6 December, Monday 10 December and Tuesday 11 December.
(3)On this day, proceedings on the European Union withdrawal motion may be proceeded with for up to eight hours from the commencement of proceedings on the Business of the House (Section 13(1)(b)  of the European Union (Withdrawal) Act 2018) motion.
(4)On the second, third and fourth allotted days, proceedings on the European Union withdrawal motion may be proceeded with for up to eight hours from the commencement of proceedings on the European Union withdrawal motion.
Decisions on any amendments
(5)No amendment to the European Union withdrawal motion may be selected before the final allotted day.
(6)In respect of the European Union withdrawal motion, the Speaker may select up to six amendments of which notice has been given.
(7)If, on the final allotted day, an amendment to the European Union withdrawal motion has been disposed of at or after the moment of interruption, any further amendments selected by the Speaker in accordance with the provisions of paragraph 6 of this Order may be moved, and the questions thereon shall be put forthwith.
(8)Questions under this Order may be put after the moment of interruption; and Standing Order No. 41A (Deferred divisions) shall not apply.
General
(9) No motion to vary or supplement the provisions of this Order shall be made except by a Minister of the Crown; and the question on any such motion shall be put forthwith.
(10)On an allotted day—
(a)no Emergency Debate shall be taken in accordance with Standing Order No. 24;
(b)no dilatory motion shall be made in relation to the proceedings on the European Union withdrawal motion except by a Minister of the Crown; and the question on any such motion shall be put forthwith;
(c)no motion shall be proposed under Standing Order No. 36 (Closure of debate) except by a Minister of the Crown; and
(d)no motion shall be proposed that the question be not now put.

On 9 January 2019 the government revised the timetable in light of the vote on 11 December 2018 being cancelled.

 
That the following provisions shall have effect.
Sitting arrangements
(1)In this Order—
‘European Union withdrawal motion’ means a motion in the name of a Minister of the Crown under section 13(1)(b) of the European Union (Withdrawal) Act 2018; and ‘allotted day’ means a day on which the first Government business is the European Union withdrawal motion.
(2)
(a)The House shall sit on Friday 11 January.
(b)The allotted days shall be Tuesday 4 December, Wednesday 5 December, Thursday 6 December, Monday 10 December, Wednesday 9 January, Thursday 10 January, Friday 11 January, Monday 14 January and Tuesday 15 January.
(3)On this day and the fifth allotted day, proceedings on the European Union withdrawal motion may be proceeded with for up to eight hours from the commencement of proceedings on a Business of the House (Section 13(1)(b) of the European Union (Withdrawal) Act 2018) motion.
(4)On the second, third, fourth, sixth and eighth allotted days, proceedings on the European Union withdrawal motion may be proceeded with for up to eight hours from the commencement of proceedings on the European Union withdrawal motion.
Decisions on any amendments
(5)No amendment to the European Union withdrawal motion may be selected before the final allotted day.
(6)In respect of the European Union withdrawal motion, the Speaker may select any number of amendments of which notice has been given.
(7)On the final allotted day, the Speaker shall put the questions necessary to dispose of proceedings on the European Union withdrawal motion at 7.00pm; and such questions shall include the questions on any amendments selected by the Speaker in accordance with the provisions of paragraph 6 of this Order which may then be moved.
(8)Questions under this Order may be put after the moment of interruption; and Standing Order No. 41A (Deferred divisions) shall not apply.
General
(9) No motion to vary or supplement the provisions of this Order shall be made except by a Minister of the Crown; and the question on any such motion shall be put forthwith;
(a)Notwithstanding the practice of this House, a Member may be called to speak twice to the Question on the European Union withdrawal motion without the leave of the House.
(10)On an allotted day—
(a)no Emergency Debate shall be taken in accordance with Standing Order No. 24;
(b)no dilatory motion shall be made in relation to the proceedings on the European Union withdrawal motion except by a Minister of the Crown; and the question on any such motion shall be put forthwith;
(c)no motion shall be proposed under Standing Order No. 36 (Closure of debate) except by a Minister of the Crown; and
(d)no motion shall be proposed that the question be not now put.

Grieve was successful in another amendment to the revised timetable (change in italics):
(7)On the final allotted day, the Speaker shall put the questions necessary to dispose of proceedings on the European Union withdrawal motion at 7.00pm; and such questions shall include the questions on any amendments selected by the Speaker in accordance with the provisions of paragraph 6 of this Order which may then be moved. In the event of the motion under Section 13(1)(b) being negatived or amended so as to be negatived, a Minister of the Crown shall table within three sitting days a motion under Section 13, considering the process of exiting the European Union under Article 50.
This meant that when the government lost the delayed meaningful vote on 15 January 2019 it had three sitting days (until 21 January 2019) to produce its 'Plan B'.

Votes during the 57th Parliament of the United Kingdom (2017–19)

First "meaningful vote" (15 January 2019) 

The meaningful vote took place in the House of Commons on 15 January 2019. The vote was originally scheduled to be held on 11 December 2018 but on 10 December, May postponed it because it became clear the government's Brexit deal would be voted down.

In the absence of any significant changes in the positions of the political parties, as expected, the government was defeated in the 15 January vote by 432 votes to 202. The 230-vote margin of defeat was the worst for any government in modern Parliamentary history. 196 Conservative MPs, 3 Labour MPs and 3 independent MPs supported the deal. Voting against the deal were 118 Conservative MPs, 248 Labour MPs, all 35 SNP MPs, all 11 Liberal Democrat MPs, all 10 DUP MPs, all 4 Plaid Cymru MPs, the sole Green MP, and 5 independent MPs.

The three Labour MPs who voted for the deal were Ian Austin, Kevin Barron, and John Mann. The three independent MPs who voted for the deal were Lady Hermon (elected as an independent), Frank Field (elected as Labour), and Stephen Lloyd (elected as a Liberal Democrat). The five independent MPs who voted against the deal were John Woodcock, Jared O'Mara, Kelvin Hopkins, Ivan Lewis, and Fiona Onasanya, all of whom had been elected as Labour.

Abstaining were one Labour MP (Paul Flynn, absent due to prolonged illness), all seven Sinn Féin MPs, who follow a policy of abstentionism, and eight others: the Speaker John Bercow, the Deputy Speakers Eleanor Laing (Conservative), Lindsay Hoyle (Labour) and Rosie Winterton (Labour); furthermore, the tellers' votes are not taken into account (for the Ayes, Wendy Morton and Iain Stewart, both Conservative, and for the Noes, Vicky Foxcroft and Nick Smith, both Labour).

 Conservative (196)

 Nigel Adams, Selby and Ainsty
 Bim Afolami, Hitchin and Harpenden
 Peter Aldous, Waveney
 Stuart Andrew, Pudsey
 Edward Argar, Charnwood
 Victoria Atkins, Louth and Horncastle
 Kemi Badenoch, Saffron Walden
 Harriett Baldwin, West Worcestershire
 Steve Barclay, North East Cambridgeshire
 Henry Bellingham, North West Norfolk
 Richard Benyon, Newbury
 Paul Beresford, Mole Valley
 Jake Berry, Rossendale and Darwen
 Nick Boles, Grantham and Stamford
 Peter Bottomley, Worthing West
 Andrew Bowie, West Aberdeenshire and Kincardine
 Karen Bradley, Staffordshire Moorlands
 Jack Brereton, Stoke-on-Trent South
 Steve Brine, Winchester
 James Brokenshire, Old Bexley and Sidcup
 Robert Buckland, South Swindon
 Alex Burghart, Brentwood and Ongar
 Alistair Burt, North East Bedfordshire
 Alun Cairns, Vale of Glamorgan
 James Cartlidge, South Suffolk
 Alex Chalk, Cheltenham
 Jo Churchill, Bury St Edmunds
 Colin Clark, Gordon
 Greg Clark, Tunbridge Wells
 Ken Clarke, Rushcliffe
 James Cleverly, Braintree
 Geoffrey Clifton-Brown, The Cotswolds
 Thérèse Coffey, Suffolk Coastal
 Alberto Costa, South Leicestershire
 Geoffrey Cox, Torridge and West Devon
 Stephen Crabb, Preseli Pembrokeshire
 Chris Davies, Brecon and Radnorshire
 David T.C. Davies, Monmouth
 Glyn Davies, Montgomeryshire
 Mims Davies, Eastleigh
 Caroline Dinenage, Gosport
 Jonathan Djanogly, Huntingdon
 Leo Docherty, Aldershot
 Michelle Donelan, Chippenham
 Oliver Dowden, Hertsmere
 Jackie Doyle-Price, Thurrock
 David Duguid, Banff and Buchan
 Alan Duncan, Rutland and Melton
 Philip Dunne, Ludlow
 Michael Ellis, Northampton North
 Tobias Ellwood, Bournemouth East
 George Eustice, Camborne and Redruth
 Mark Field, Cities of London and Westminster
 Vicky Ford, Chelmsford
 Kevin Foster, Torbay
 Liam Fox, North Somerset
 Lucy Frazer, South East Cambridgeshire
 George Freeman, Mid Norfolk
 Mike Freer, Finchley and Golders Green
 Roger Gale, North Thanet
 Mark Garnier, Wyre Forest
 David Gauke, South West Hertfordshire
 Nus Ghani, Wealden
 Nick Gibb, Bognor Regis and Littlehampton
 Cheryl Gillan, Chesham and Amersham
 John Glen, Salisbury
 Robert Goodwill, Scarborough and Whitby 
 Michael Gove, Surrey Heath
 Luke Graham, Ochil and South Perthshire
 Richard Graham, Gloucester
 Bill Grant, Ayr, Carrick and Cumnock
 Helen Grant, Maidstone and The Weald
 Chris Grayling, Epsom and Ewell
 Damian Green, Ashford
 Andrew Griffiths, Burton
 Kirstene Hair, Angus
 Luke Hall, Thornbury and Yate
 Philip Hammond, Runnymede and Weybridge
 Stephen Hammond, Wimbledon
 Matt Hancock, West Suffolk
 Richard Harrington, Watford
 Rebecca Harris, Castle Point
 Trudy Harrison, Copeland
 Simon Hart, Carmarthen West and South Pembrokeshire
 Oliver Heald, North East Hertfordshire
 James Heappey, Wells
 Chris Heaton-Harris, Daventry
 Peter Heaton-Jones, North Devon
 Nick Herbert, Arundel and South Downs
 Damian Hinds, East Hampshire
 Simon Hoare, North Dorset
 George Hollingbery, Meon Valley
 Kevin Hollinrake, Thirsk and Malton
 John Howell, Henley
 Nigel Huddleston, Mid Worcestershire
 Jeremy Hunt, South West Surrey
 Nick Hurd, Ruislip, Northwood and Pinner
 Alister Jack, Dumfries and Galloway
 Margot James, Stourbridge
 Sajid Javid, Bromsgrove
 Robert Jenrick, Newark
 Caroline Johnson, Sleaford and North Hykeham
 Andrew Jones, Harrogate and Knaresborough
 Marcus Jones, Nuneaton
 Gillian Keegan, Chichester
 Seema Kennedy, South Ribble
 Stephen Kerr, Stirling
 Julian Knight, Solihull
 Kwasi Kwarteng, Spelthorne
 Mark Lancaster, Milton Keynes North
 Andrea Leadsom, South Northamptonshire
 Jeremy Lefroy, Stafford
 Edward Leigh, Gainsborough
 Oliver Letwin, West Dorset
 Brandon Lewis, Great Yarmouth
 David Lidington, Aylesbury
 Jack Lopresti, Filton and Bradley Stoke
 Rachel Maclean, Redditch
 Alan Mak, Havant
 Kit Malthouse, North West Hampshire
 Paul Masterton, East Renfrewshire
 Theresa May, Maidenhead
 Paul Maynard, Blackpool North and Cleveleys
 Patrick McLoughlin, Derbyshire Dales
 Mark Menzies, Fylde
 Huw Merriman, Bexhill and Battle
 Maria Miller, Basingstoke
 Amanda Milling, Cannock Chase
 Anne Milton, Guildford
 Penny Mordaunt, Portsmouth North
 Nicky Morgan, Loughborough
 David Morris, Morecambe and Lunesdale
 James Morris, Halesowen and Rowley Regis
 David Mundell, Dumfriesshire, Clydesdale and Tweeddale
 Andrew Murrison, South West Wiltshire
 Bob Neill, Bromley and Chislehurst
 Sarah Newton, Truro and Falmouth
 Caroline Nokes, Romsey and Southampton North
 Jesse Norman, Hereford and South Herefordshire
 Neil O'Brien, Harborough
 Guy Opperman, Hexham
 Neil Parish, Tiverton and Honiton
 Mark Pawsey, Rugby
 John Penrose, Weston-super-Mare
 Andrew Percy, Brigg and Goole
 Claire Perry, Devizes
 Chris Philp, Croydon South
 Christopher Pincher, Tamworth
 Dan Poulter, Central Suffolk and North Ipswich
 Rebecca Pow, Taunton Deane
 Victoria Prentis, Banbury
 Mark Prisk, Hertford and Stortford
 Jeremy Quin, Horsham
 Mary Robinson, Cheadle
 Amber Rudd, Hastings and Rye
 David Rutley, Macclesfield
 Antoinette Sandbach, Eddisbury
 Paul Scully, Sutton and Cheam
 Bob Seely, Isle of Wight
 Andrew Selous, South West Bedfordshire
 Alok Sharma, Reading West
 Alec Shelbrooke, Elmet and Rothwell
 Keith Simpson, Broadland
 Chris Skidmore, Kingswood
 Chloe Smith, Norwich North
 Julian Smith, Skipton and Ripon
 Nicholas Soames, Mid Sussex
 Caroline Spelman, Meriden
 Mark Spencer, Sherwood
 Andrew Stephenson, Pendle
 John Stevenson, Carlisle
 Rory Stewart, Penrith and The Border
 Gary Streeter, South West Devon
 Mel Stride, Central Devon
 Graham Stuart, Beverley and Holderness
 Rishi Sunak, Richmond (Yorks)
 Desmond Swayne, New Forest West
 Maggie Throup, Erewash
 Kelly Tolhurst, Rochester and Strood
 Justin Tomlinson, North Swindon
 David Tredinnick, Bosworth
 Liz Truss, South West Norfolk
 Tom Tugendhat, Tonbridge and Malling
 Ed Vaizey, Wantage
 Charles Walker, Broxbourne
 Robin Walker, Worcester
 Ben Wallace, Wyre and Preston North
 David Warburton, Somerton and Frome
 Matt Warman, Boston and Skegness
 Helen Whately, Faversham and Mid Kent
 Heather Wheeler, South Derbyshire
 Craig Whittaker, Calder Valley
 Gavin Williamson, South Staffordshire
 Mike Wood, Dudley South
 Jeremy Wright, Kenilworth and Southam
 Nadhim Zahawi, Stratford-on-Avon

 Independent (3)

 Frank Field, Birkenhead
 Sylvia Hermon, North Down
 Stephen Lloyd, Eastbourne

 Labour (3)

 Ian Austin, Dudley North
 Kevin Barron, Rother Valley
 John Mann, Bassetlaw

 Conservative (118)

 Adam Afriyie, Windsor
 Lucy Allan, Telford
 Heidi Allen, South Cambridgeshire
 David Amess, Southend West
 Richard Bacon, South Norfolk
 Steve Baker, Wycombe
 John Baron, Basildon and Billericay
 Guto Bebb, Aberconwy
 Bob Blackman, Harrow East
 Crispin Blunt, Reigate
 Peter Bone, Wellingborough
 Ben Bradley, Mansfield
 Graham Brady, Altrincham and Sale West
 Suella Braverman, Fareham
 Andrew Bridgen, North West Leicestershire
 Fiona Bruce, Congleton
 Conor Burns, Bournemouth West
 Bill Cash, Stone
 Maria Caulfield, Lewes
 Rehman Chishti, Gillingham and Rainham
 Christopher Chope, Christchurch
 Simon Clarke, Middlesbrough South and East Cleveland
 Damian Collins, Folkestone and Hythe
 Robert Courts, Witney
 Tracey Crouch, Chatham and Aylesford
 Philip Davies, Shipley
 David Davis, Haltemprice and Howden
 Nadine Dorries, Mid Bedfordshire
 Steve Double, St Austell and Newquay
 Richard Drax, South Dorset
 James Duddridge, Rochford and Southend East
 Iain Duncan Smith, Chingford and Woodford Green
 Charlie Elphicke, Dover
 Nigel Evans, Ribble Valley
 David Evennett, Bexleyheath and Crayford
 Michael Fabricant, Lichfield
 Michael Fallon, Sevenoaks
 Mark Francois, Rayleigh and Wickford
 Marcus Fysh, Yeovil
 Zac Goldsmith, Richmond Park (Surrey)
 James Gray, North Wiltshire
 Chris Green, Bolton West
 Justine Greening, Putney
 Dominic Grieve, Beaconsfield
 Sam Gyimah, East Surrey
 Robert Halfon, Harlow
 Greg Hands, Chelsea and Fulham
 Mark Harper, Forest of Dean
 John Hayes, South Holland and The Deepings
 Gordon Henderson, Sittingbourne and Sheppey
 Philip Hollobone, Kettering
 Adam Holloway, Gravesham
 Eddie Hughes, Walsall North
 Ranil Jayawardena, North East Hampshire
 Bernard Jenkin, Harwich and North Essex
 Andrea Jenkyns, Morley and Outwood
 Boris Johnson, Uxbridge and South Ruislip
 Gareth Johnson, Dartford
 Jo Johnson, Orpington
 David Jones, Clwyd West
 Daniel Kawczynski, Shrewsbury and Atcham
 Greg Knight, East Yorkshire
 John Lamont, Berwickshire, Roxburgh and Selkirk
 Pauline Latham, Mid Derbyshire
 Phillip Lee, Bracknell
 Andrew Lewer, Northampton South
 Julian Lewis, New Forest East
 Ian Liddell-Grainger, Bridgwater and West Somerset
 Julia Lopez, Hornchurch and Upminster
 Jonathan Lord, Woking
 Tim Loughton, East Worthing and Shoreham
 Craig Mackinlay, South Thanet
 Anne Main, St Albans
 Scott Mann, North Cornwall
 Stephen McPartland, Stevenage
 Esther McVey, Tatton
 Johnny Mercer, Plymouth, Moor View
 Stephen Metcalfe, South Basildon and East Thurrock
 Nigel Mills, Amber Valley
 Andrew Mitchell, Sutton Coldfield
 Damien Moore, Southport
 Anne Marie Morris, Newton Abbot
 Sheryll Murray, South East Cornwall
 Matthew Offord, Hendon
 Priti Patel, Witham
 Owen Paterson, North Shropshire
 Mike Penning, Hemel Hempstead
 Mark Pritchard, The Wrekin
 Tom Pursglove, Corby
 Will Quince, Colchester
 Dominic Raab, Esher and Walton
 John Redwood, Wokingham
 Jacob Rees-Mogg, North East Somerset
 Laurence Robertson, Tewkesbury
 Andrew Rosindell, Romford
 Douglas Ross, Moray
 Lee Rowley, North East Derbyshire
 Grant Shapps, Welwyn Hatfield
 Henry Smith, Crawley
 Royston Smith, Southampton Itchen
 Anna Soubry, Broxtowe
 Bob Stewart, Beckenham
 Julian Sturdy, York Outer
 Hugo Swire, East Devon
 Robert Syms, Poole
 Derek Thomas, St Ives
 Ross Thomson, Aberdeen South
 Michael Tomlinson, Mid Dorset and North Poole
 Craig Tracey, North Warwickshire
 Anne-Marie Trevelyan, Berwick-upon-Tweed
 Shailesh Vara, North West Cambridgeshire
 Martin Vickers, Cleethorpes
 Theresa Villiers, Chipping Barnet
 Giles Watling, Clacton
 John Whittingdale , Maldon
 Bill Wiggin, North Herefordshire
 Sarah Wollaston, Totnes
 William Wragg, Hazel Grove

 Democratic Unionist Party (10)

 Gregory Campbell, East Londonderry
 Nigel Dodds, Belfast North
 Jeffrey Donaldson, Lagan Valley
 Paul Girvan, South Antrim
 Emma Little-Pengelly, Belfast South
 Ian Paisley, North Antrim
 Gavin Robinson, Belfast East
 Jim Shannon, Strangford
 David Simpson, Upper Bann
 Sammy Wilson, East Antrim

 Green (1)

 Caroline Lucas, Brighton Pavilion

 Independent (5)

 Kelvin Hopkins, Luton North
 Ivan Lewis, Bury South
 Jared O'Mara, Sheffield Hallam
 Fiona Onasanya, Peterborough
 John Woodcock, Barrow and Furness

 Labour (248)

 Diane Abbott, Hackney North and Stoke Newington
 Debbie Abrahams, Oldham East and Saddleworth
 Rushanara Ali, Bethnal Green and Bow
 Rosena Allin-Khan, Tooting
 Mike Amesbury, Weaver Vale
 Tonia Antoniazzi, Gower
 Jon Ashworth, Leicester South
 Adrian Bailey, West Bromwich West
 Margaret Beckett, Derby South
 Hilary Benn, Leeds Central
 Luciana Berger, Liverpool Riverside
 Clive Betts, Sheffield South East
 Roberta Blackman-Woods, City of Durham
 Paul Blomfield, Sheffield Central
 Tracy Brabin, Batley and Spen
 Ben Bradshaw, Exeter
 Kevin Brennan, Cardiff West
 Lyn Brown, West Ham
 Nick Brown, Newcastle-upon-Tyne East and Wallsend
 Chris Bryant, Rhondda
 Karen Buck, Westminster North
 Richard Burden, Birmingham Northfield
 Richard Burgon, Leeds East
 Dawn Butler, Brent Central
 Liam Byrne, Birmingham Hodge Hill
 Ruth Cadbury, Brentford and Isleworth
 Alan Campbell, Tynemouth
 Ronnie Campbell, Blyth Valley
 Dan Carden, Liverpool Walton
 Sarah Champion, Rotherham
 Jenny Chapman, Darlington
 Bambos Charalambous, Enfield Southgate
 Ann Clwyd, Cynon Valley
 Vernon Coaker, Gedling
 Ann Coffey, Stockport
 Julie Cooper, Burnley
 Rosie Cooper, West Lancashire
 Yvette Cooper, Normanton, Pontefract and Castleford
 Jeremy Corbyn, Islington North
 Neil Coyle, Bermondsey and Old Southwark
 David Crausby, Bolton North East
 Mary Creagh, Wakefield
 Stella Creasy, Walthamstow
 Jon Cruddas, Dagenham and Rainham
 John Cryer, Leyton and Wanstead
 Judith Cummins, Bradford South
 Alex Cunningham, Stockton North
 Jim Cunningham, Coventry South
 Janet Daby, Lewisham East
 Nic Dakin, Scunthorpe
 Wayne David, Caerphilly
 Geraint Davies Swansea West
 Marsha de Cordova, Battersea
 Gloria De Piero, Ashfield
 Thangam Debbonaire, Bristol West
 Emma Dent Coad, Kensington
 Tanmanjeet Singh Dhesi, Slough
 Anneliese Dodds, Oxford East
 Stephen Doughty, Cardiff South and Penarth
 Peter Dowd, Bootle
 David Drew, Stroud
 Jack Dromey, Birmingham Erdington
 Rosie Duffield, Canterbury
 Angela Eagle, Wallasey
 Maria Eagle, Garston and Halewood
 Clive Efford, Eltham
 Julie Elliott, Sunderland Central
 Louise Ellman, Liverpool Riverside
 Chris Elmore, Ogmore
 Bill Esterson, Sefton Central
 Chris Evans, Islwyn
 Paul Farrelly, Newcastle-under-Lyme
 Jim Fitzpatrick Poplar and Limehouse
 Colleen Fletcher, Coventry North East
 Caroline Flint, Don Valley
 Yvonne Fovargue, Makerfield
 James Frith, Bury North
 Gill Furniss, Sheffield Brightside and Hillsborough
 Hugh Gaffney, Coatbridge, Chryston and Bellshill
 Mike Gapes, Ilford South
 Barry Gardiner, Brent North
 Ruth George, High Peak
 Preet Gill, Birmingham Edgbaston
 Mary Glindon, North Tyneside
 Roger Godsiff, Birmingham Hall Green
 Helen Goodman, Bishop Auckland
 Kate Green, Stretford and Urmston
 Lilian Greenwood, Nottingham South
 Margaret Greenwood, Wirral West
 Nia Griffith, Llanelli
 John Grogan, Keighley
 Andrew Gwynne, Denton and Reddish
 Louise Haigh, Sheffield Heeley
 Fabian Hamilton, Leeds North East
 David Hanson, Delyn
 Emma Hardy, Kingston upon Hull West and Hessle
 Harriet Harman, Camberwell and Peckham
 Carolyn Harris, Swansea East
 Helen Hayes, Dulwich and West Norwood
 Sue Hayman, Workington
 John Healey, Wentworth and Dearne
 Mark Hendrick, Preston
 Stephen Hepburn, Jarrow
 Mike Hill, Hartlepool
 Meg Hillier, Hackney South and Shoreditch
 Margaret Hodge, Barking
 Sharon Hodgson, Washington and Sunderland West
 Kate Hoey, Vauxhall
 Kate Hollern, Blackburn
 George Howarth, Knowsley
 Rupa Huq, Ealing Central and Acton
 Imran Hussain, Bradford East
 Dan Jarvis, Barnsley Central
 Diana Johnson, Kingston upon Hull North
 Darren Jones, Bristol North West
 Gerald Jones, Merthyr Tydfil and Rhymney
 Graham Jones, Hyndburn
 Helen Jones, Warrington North
 Kevan Jones, North Durham
 Sarah Jones, Croydon Central
 Susan Elan Jones, Clwyd South
 Mike Kane, Wythenshawe and Sale East
 Barbara Keeley, Worsley and Eccles South
 Liz Kendall, Leicester West
 Afzal Khan, Manchester Gorton
 Gerard Killen, Rutherglen and Hamilton West
 Stephen Kinnock, Aberavon
 Peter Kyle, Hove
 Lesley Laird, Kirkcaldy and Cowdenbeath
 David Lammy, Tottenham
 Ian Lavery, Wansbeck
 Karen Lee, Lincoln
 Chris Leslie, Nottingham East
 Emma Lewell-Buck, South Shields
 Clive Lewis, Norwich South
 Tony Lloyd, Rochdale
 Rebecca Long-Bailey, Salford and Eccles
 Ian Lucas, Wrexham
 Holly Lynch, Halifax
 Justin Madders, Ellesmere Port and Neston
 Khalid Mahmood, Birmingham Perry Barr
 Shabana Mahmood, Birmingham Ladywood
 Seema Malhotra, Feltham and Heston
 Gordon Marsden, Blackpool South
 Sandy Martin, Ipswich
 Rachael Maskell, York Central
 Chris Matheson, City of Chester
 Steve McCabe, Birmingham Selly Oak
 Kerry McCarthy, Bristol East
 Siobhain McDonagh, Mitcham and Morden
 Andy McDonald, Middlesbrough
 John McDonnell, Hayes and Harlington
 Pat McFadden, Wolverhampton South East
 Conor McGinn, St Helens North
 Alison McGovern, Wirral South
 Liz McInnes, Heywood and Middleton
 Catherine McKinnell, Newcastle upon Tyne North
 Jim McMahon, Oldham West and Royton
 Anna McMorrin, Cardiff North
 Ian Mearns, Gateshead
 Ed Miliband, Doncaster North
 Madeleine Moon, Bridgend
 Jessica Morden, Newport East
 Stephen Morgan, Portsmouth South
 Grahame Morris, Easington
 Ian Murray, Edinburgh South
 Lisa Nandy, Wigan
 Alex Norris, Nottingham North
 Melanie Onn, Great Grimsby
 Chi Onwurah, Newcastle upon Tyne Central
 Kate Osamor, Edmonton
 Albert Owen, Ynys Môn
 Stephanie Peacock, Barnsley East
 Teresa Pearce, Erith and Thamesmead
 Matthew Pennycook, Greenwich and Woolwich
 Toby Perkins, Chesterfield
 Jess Phillips, Birmingham Yardley
 Bridget Phillipson, Houghton and Sunderland South
 Laura Pidcock, North West Durham
 Jo Platt, Leigh
 Luke Pollard, Plymouth Sutton and Devonport
 Stephen Pound, Ealing North
 Lucy Powell, Manchester Central
 Yasmin Qureshi, Bolton South East
 Faisal Rashid, Warrington South
 Angela Rayner, Ashton-under-Lyne
 Steve Reed, Croydon North
 Christina Rees, Neath
 Ellie Reeves, Lewisham West and Penge
 Rachel Reeves, Leeds West
 Emma Reynolds, Wolverhampton North East
 Jonathan Reynolds, Stalybridge and Hyde
 Marie Rimmer, St Helens South and Whiston
 Geoffrey Robinson, Coventry North West
 Matt Rodda, Reading East
 Danielle Rowley, Midlothian
 Chris Ruane, Vale of Clwyd
 Lloyd Russell-Moyle, Brighton Kemptown
 Joan Ryan, Enfield North
 Naz Shah, Bradford West
 Virendra Sharma, Ealing Southall
 Barry Sheerman, Huddersfield
 Paula Sherriff, Dewsbury
 Gavin Shuker, Luton South
 Tulip Siddiq, Hampstead and Kilburn
 Dennis Skinner, Bolsover
 Andy Slaughter, Hammersmith
 Ruth Smeeth, Stoke-on-Trent North
 Angela Smith, Penistone and Stocksbridge
 Cat Smith, Lancaster and Fleetwood
 Eleanor Smith, Wolverhampton South West
 Jeff Smith, Manchester Withington
 Laura Smith, Crewe and Nantwich
 Owen Smith, Pontypridd
 Karin Smyth, Bristol South
 Gareth Snell, Stoke-on-Trent Central
 Alex Sobel, Leeds North West
 John Spellar, Birmingham Northfield
 Keir Starmer, Holborn and St Pancras
 Jo Stevens, Cardiff Central
 Wes Streeting, Ilford North
 Graham Stringer, Blackley and Broughton
 Paul Sweeney, Glasgow North East
 Mark Tami, Alyn and Deeside
 Gareth Thomas, Harrow West
 Nick Thomas-Symonds, Torfaen
 Emily Thornberry, Islington South and Finsbury
 Stephen Timms, East Ham
 Jon Trickett, Hemsworth
 Anna Turley, Redcar
 Karl Turner, Kingston upon Hull East
 Derek Twigg, Halton
 Stephen Twigg, Liverpool West Derby
 Liz Twist, Blaydon
 Chuka Umunna, Streatham
 Keith Vaz, Leicester East
 Valerie Vaz, Walsall South
 Thelma Walker, Colne Valley
 Tom Watson, West Bromwich East
 Catherine West, Hornsey and Wood Green
 Matthew Western, Warwick and Leamington
 Alan Whitehead, Southampton Test
 Martin Whitfield East Lothian
 Paul Williams, Stockton South
 Chris Williamson, Derby North
 Phil Wilson, Sedgefield
 Mohammad Yasin, Bedford
 Daniel Zeichner, Cambridge

 Liberal Democrat (11)

 Tom Brake, Carshalton and Wallington
 Vince Cable, Twickenham
 Alistair Carmichael, Orkney and Shetland
 Ed Davey, Kingston and Surbiton
 Tim Farron, Westmorland and Lonsdale
 Wera Hobhouse, Bath
 Christine Jardine, Edinburgh West
 Norman Lamb, North Norfolk
 Layla Moran, Oxford West and Abingdon
 Jamie Stone, Caithness, Sutherland and Easter Ross
 Jo Swinson, East Dunbartonshire

 Plaid Cymru (4)

 Jonathan Edwards, Carmarthen East and Dinefwr
 Ben Lake, Ceredigion
 Liz Saville Roberts, Dwyfor Meirionnydd
 Hywel Williams, Arfon

 Scottish National Party (35)

 Hannah Bardell, Livingston
 Mhairi Black, Paisley and Renfrewshire South
 Ian Blackford, Ross, Skye and Lochaber 
 Kirsty Blackman, Aberdeen North
 Deidre Brock, Edinburgh North and Leith
 Alan Brown, Kilmarnock and Loudoun
 Lisa Cameron, East Kilbride, Strathaven and Lesmahagow
 Douglas Chapman, Dunfermline and West Fife
 Joanna Cherry, Edinburgh South West
 Ronnie Cowan, Inverclyde
 Angela Crawley, Lanark and Hamilton East
 Martyn Day, Linlithgow and East Falkirk
 Martin Docherty-Hughes, West Dunbartonshire
 Marion Fellows, Motherwell and Wishaw
 Stephen Gethins, North East Fife
 Patricia Gibson, North Ayrshire and Arran
 Patrick Grady, Glasgow North
 Peter Grant, Glenrothes
 Neil Gray, Airdrie and Shotts
 Drew Hendry, Inverness, Nairn, Badenoch and Strathspey
 Stewart Hosie, Dundee East
 Chris Law, Dundee West
 David Linden, Glasgow East
 Angus MacNeil, Na h-Eileanan an Iar
 John McNally, Falkirk
 Stewart McDonald, Glasgow South
 Stuart McDonald, Cumbernauld, Kilsyth and Kirkintilloch East
 Carol Monaghan, Glasgow North West
 Gavin Newlands, Paisley and Renfrewshire North
 Brendan O'Hara, Argyll and Bute
 Tommy Sheppard, Edinburgh East
 Chris Stephens, Glasgow South West
 Alison Thewliss, Glasgow Central
 Philippa Whitford, Central Ayrshire
 Pete Wishart, Perth and North Perthshire

 Labour (1)

 Paul Flynn, Newport West (due to ill health)

In the immediate aftermath, Leader of the Opposition Jeremy Corbyn called for a vote of no confidence in the government, which was held on 16 January 2019. The government won the vote by 325 to 306, a majority of 19.

Vote on "motion in neutral terms" (29 January 2019)
Section 13 of the 2018 Act required that the government put down a motion, in neutral terms, in response to the written statements made by the prime minister on 21 and 24 January, in which she set out her "Plan B". In accordance with Dominic Grieve's "three day amendment" to the parliamentary timetable, this motion was tabled on 21 January (three sitting days after the draft Withdrawal Agreement was rejected by MPs), and it was put to a vote on 29 January 2019. It took the form of a resolution to the effect that the House of Commons had "considered" the Prime Minister's statements. This neutral motion was subject to amendment, and prior to voting on the main motion, the Commons voted on seven amendments, proposed by MPs and selected by the Speaker.

Two amendments were passed. The Brady amendment called on the Government to re-negotiate over the Northern Ireland backstop. It passed by 16 votes, supported by the Conservatives and DUP over other parties in the Commons, but with 7 Labour MPs supporting it and 8 Conservative MPs voting against it. The Spelman-Dromey amendment declared the desire of the Commons to avoid a no-deal Brexit. It passed by 8 votes, supported by all the parties other than the Conservatives and DUP, but with the support of 17 Conservative MPs. An amendment seeking to pave the way for a binding legislation that would prevent no deal, the Cooper-Boles amendment, failed by 23 votes. Three other amendments also failed. The main motion (as amended) was then passed without a division.

Resolved, That this House, in accordance with the provisions of section 13(6)(a) and 13(11)(b)(i) and 13(13)(b) of the European Union (Withdrawal) Act 2018, has considered the Written Statement titled "Statement under Section 13(4) of the European Union (Withdrawal) Act 2018" and made on 21 January 2019, and the Written Statement titled "Statement under Section 13(11)(a) of the European Union (Withdrawal) Act 2018" and made on 24 January 2019, and rejects the United Kingdom leaving the European Union without a Withdrawal Agreement and a Framework for the Future Relationship, and requires the Northern Ireland backstop to be replaced with alternative arrangements to avoid a hard border; supports leaving the European Union with a deal and would therefore support the Withdrawal Agreement subject to this change.

May stated that a further "meaningful vote" would be held "as soon as we possibly can", but that if it did not take place by 13 February then she would present a statement, to be followed by a debate on an amendable motion on 14 February.

Vote on amendable motion (14 February 2019)
On 12 February 2019, Theresa May made a statement to the House of Commons on the government's progress in securing a withdrawal agreement. This was followed, on 14 February, by a vote on an amendable motion in the following terms: "That this House welcomes the Prime Minister’s statement of 12 February 2019; reiterates its support for the approach to leaving the EU expressed by this House on 29 January 2019 and notes that discussions between the UK and the EU on the Northern Ireland backstop are ongoing."'

All proposed amendments to the motion were defeated. The motion itself was then defeated, by a margin of 303–259, due in part to abstentions by the European Research Group faction of Conservative MPs, who objected that the motion appeared to rule out leaving the EU without a withdrawal agreement.

In her statement on 12 February, the prime minister reiterated her goal of having a second "meaningful vote" on a withdrawal agreement. She indicated that if this was not achieved by 26 February the government would make another statement to the House on the government's progress, and table an amendable motion relating to that statement, which would be put to a vote on 27 February.

Vote on amendable motion (27 February 2019)
On 27 February 2019, the House of Commons voted on an amendable motion in the following terms: "That this House notes the Prime Minister’s statement on Leaving the European Union of 26 February 2019; and further notes that discussions between the UK and the EU are ongoing."

Two amendments were passed.  An amendment to seek a joint UK-EU commitment to citizens' rights was passed without a division.  An amendment to specify the timeframe for further meaningful votes in March 2019 was passed by a margin of 502–20.  The main motion (as amended) was then passed without a division.

Resolved, That this House notes the Prime Minister’s statement on Leaving the European Union of 26 February 2019; and further notes that discussions between the UK and the EU are ongoing; and requires the Prime Minister to seek at the earliest opportunity a joint UK-EU commitment to adopt part two of the Withdrawal Agreement on Citizens’ Rights and ensure its implementation prior to the UK’s exiting the European Union, whatever the outcome of negotiations on other aspects of the Withdrawal Agreement; and further notes in particular the commitment of the Prime Minister made in this House to hold a second meaningful vote by 12 March and if the House, having rejected leaving with the deal negotiated with the EU, then rejects leaving on 29 March without a withdrawal agreement and future framework, the Government will, on 14 March, bring forward a motion on whether Parliament wants to seek a short limited extension to Article 50, and if the House votes for an extension, seek to agree that extension approved by the House with the EU, and bring forward the necessary legislation to change the exit date commensurate with that extension.

Second "meaningful vote" (12 March 2019) 
The second meaningful vote took place on 12 March 2019. The deal was supported by 235 Conservative MPs, four independent MPs, and Labour MPs Kevin Barron, Caroline Flint and John Mann, and was opposed by the remaining MPs, including all 10 DUP MPs and 75 Conservative MPs. One Conservative MP, Douglas Ross, was unable to vote or exercise his right to a proxy vote due to the birth of his child on the day of the vote.

It was also noted that Holby City episode A Simple Lie Part 1 was delayed on BBC One for a week for coverage of the vote.

 Conservative (235)

 Nigel Adams, Selby and Ainsty
 Bim Afolami, Hitchin and Harpenden
 Peter Aldous, Waveney
 David Amess, Southend West
 Stuart Andrew, Pudsey
 Edward Argar, Charnwood
 Victoria Atkins, Louth and Horncastle
 Kemi Badenoch, Saffron Walden
 Harriett Baldwin, West Worcestershire
 Steve Barclay, North East Cambridgeshire
 Henry Bellingham, North West Norfolk
 Richard Benyon, Newbury
 Paul Beresford, Mole Valley
 Jake Berry, Rossendale and Darwen
 Bob Blackman, Harrow East
 Nick Boles, Grantham and Stamford
 Peter Bottomley, Worthing West
 Andrew Bowie, West Aberdeenshire and Kincardine
 Ben Bradley, Mansfield
 Karen Bradley, Staffordshire Moorlands
 Graham Brady, Altrincham and Sale West
 Jack Brereton, Stoke-on-Trent South
 Steve Brine, Winchester
 James Brokenshire, Old Bexley and Sidcup
 Fiona Bruce, Congleton
 Robert Buckland, South Swindon
 Alex Burghart, Brentwood and Ongar
 Alistair Burt, North East Bedfordshire
 Alun Cairns, Vale of Glamorgan
 James Cartlidge, South Suffolk
 Maria Caulfield, Lewes
 Alex Chalk, Cheltenham
 Jo Churchill, Bury St Edmunds
 Colin Clark, Gordon
 Greg Clark, Tunbridge Wells
 Ken Clarke, Rushcliffe
 James Cleverly, Braintree
 Geoffrey Clifton-Brown, The Cotswolds
 Thérèse Coffey, Suffolk Coastal
 Alberto Costa, South Leicestershire
 Geoffrey Cox, Torridge and West Devon
 Stephen Crabb, Preseli Pembrokeshire
 Tracey Crouch, Chatham and Aylesford
 Chris Davies, Brecon and Radnorshire
 David T.C. Davies, Monmouth
 Glyn Davies, Montgomeryshire
 Mims Davies, Eastleigh
 Philip Davies, Shipley
 David Davis, Haltemprice and Howden
 Caroline Dinenage, Gosport
 Jonathan Djanogly, Huntingdon
 Leo Docherty, Aldershot
 Michelle Donelan, Chippenham
 Nadine Dorries, Mid Bedfordshire
 Steve Double, St Austell and Newquay
 Oliver Dowden, Hertsmere
 Jackie Doyle-Price, Thurrock
 David Duguid, Banff and Buchan
 Alan Duncan, Rutland and Melton
 Philip Dunne, Ludlow
 Michael Ellis, Northampton North
 Tobias Ellwood, Bournemouth East
 George Eustice, Camborne and Redruth
 Nigel Evans, Ribble Valley
 David Evennett, Bexleyheath and Crayford
 Mark Field, Cities of London and Westminster
 Vicky Ford, Chelmsford
 Kevin Foster, Torbay
 Liam Fox, North Somerset
 Lucy Frazer, South East Cambridgeshire
 George Freeman, Mid Norfolk
 Mike Freer, Finchley and Golders Green
 Roger Gale, North Thanet
 Mark Garnier, Wyre Forest
 David Gauke, South West Hertfordshire
 Nus Ghani, Wealden
 Nick Gibb, Bognor Regis and Littlehampton
 Cheryl Gillan, Chesham and Amersham
 John Glen, Salisbury
 Zac Goldsmith, Richmond Park (Surrey)
 Robert Goodwill, Scarborough and Whitby 
 Michael Gove, Surrey Heath
 Luke Graham, Ochil and South Perthshire
 Richard Graham, Gloucester
 Bill Grant, Ayr, Carrick and Cumnock
 Helen Grant, Maidstone and The Weald
 Chris Grayling, Epsom and Ewell
 Damian Green, Ashford
 Andrew Griffiths, Burton
 Kirstene Hair, Angus
 Robert Halfon, Harlow
 Luke Hall, Thornbury and Yate
 Philip Hammond, Runnymede and Weybridge
 Stephen Hammond, Wimbledon
 Matt Hancock, West Suffolk
 Greg Hands, Chelsea and Fulham
 Richard Harrington, Watford
 Rebecca Harris, Castle Point
 Trudy Harrison, Copeland
 Simon Hart, Carmarthen West and South Pembrokeshire
 John Hayes, South Holland and The Deepings
 Oliver Heald, North East Hertfordshire
 James Heappey, Wells
 Chris Heaton-Harris, Daventry
 Peter Heaton-Jones, North Devon
 Nick Herbert, Arundel and South Downs
 Damian Hinds, East Hampshire
 Simon Hoare, North Dorset
 George Hollingbery, Meon Valley
 Kevin Hollinrake, Thirsk and Malton
 John Howell, Henley
 Nigel Huddleston, Mid Worcestershire
 Jeremy Hunt, South West Surrey
 Nick Hurd, Ruislip, Northwood and Pinner
 Alister Jack, Dumfries and Galloway
 Margot James, Stourbridge
 Sajid Javid, Bromsgrove
 Robert Jenrick, Newark
 Caroline Johnson, Sleaford and North Hykeham
 Andrew Jones, Harrogate and Knaresborough
 Marcus Jones, Nuneaton
 Gillian Keegan, Chichester
 Seema Kennedy, South Ribble
 Stephen Kerr, Stirling
 Greg Knight, East Yorkshire
 Julian Knight, Solihull
 Kwasi Kwarteng, Spelthorne
 John Lamont, Berwickshire, Roxburgh and Selkirk
 Mark Lancaster, Milton Keynes North
 Andrea Leadsom, South Northamptonshire
 Jeremy Lefroy, Stafford
 Edward Leigh, Gainsborough
 Oliver Letwin, West Dorset
 Brandon Lewis, Great Yarmouth
 David Lidington, Aylesbury
 Jack Lopresti, Filton and Bradley Stoke
 Tim Loughton, East Worthing and Shoreham
 Rachel Maclean, Redditch
 Alan Mak, Havant
 Kit Malthouse, North West Hampshire
 Scott Mann, North Cornwall
 Paul Masterton, East Renfrewshire
 Theresa May, Maidenhead
 Paul Maynard, Blackpool North and Cleveleys
 Patrick McLoughlin, Derbyshire Dales
 Stephen McPartland, Stevenage
 Mark Menzies, Fylde
 Johnny Mercer, Plymouth, Moor View
 Huw Merriman, Bexhill and Battle
 Stephen Metcalfe, South Basildon and East Thurrock
 Maria Miller, Basingstoke
 Amanda Milling, Cannock Chase
 Nigel Mills, Amber Valley
 Anne Milton, Guildford
 Andrew Mitchell, Sutton Coldfield
 Damien Moore, Southport
 Penny Mordaunt, Portsmouth North
 Nicky Morgan, Loughborough
 David Morris, Morecambe and Lunesdale
 James Morris, Halesowen and Rowley Regis
 Wendy Morton, Aldridge-Brownhills
 David Mundell, Dumfriesshire, Clydesdale and Tweeddale
 Andrew Murrison, South West Wiltshire
 Bob Neill, Bromley and Chislehurst
 Sarah Newton, Truro and Falmouth
 Caroline Nokes, Romsey and Southampton North
 Jesse Norman, Hereford and South Herefordshire
 Neil O'Brien, Harborough
 Matthew Offord, Hendon
 Guy Opperman, Hexham
 Neil Parish, Tiverton and Honiton
 Mark Pawsey, Rugby
 Mike Penning, Hemel Hempstead
 John Penrose, Weston-super-Mare
 Andrew Percy, Brigg and Goole
 Claire Perry, Devizes
 Chris Philp, Croydon South
 Christopher Pincher, Tamworth
 Dan Poulter, Central Suffolk and North Ipswich
 Rebecca Pow, Taunton Deane
 Victoria Prentis, Banbury
 Mark Prisk, Hertford and Stortford
 Mark Pritchard, The Wrekin
 Jeremy Quin, Horsham
 Will Quince, Colchester
 Mary Robinson, Cheadle
 Amber Rudd, Hastings and Rye
 David Rutley, Macclesfield
 Antoinette Sandbach, Eddisbury
 Paul Scully, Sutton and Cheam
 Bob Seely, Isle of Wight
 Andrew Selous, South West Bedfordshire
 Alok Sharma, Reading West
 Alec Shelbrooke, Elmet and Rothwell
 Keith Simpson, Broadland
 Chris Skidmore, Kingswood
 Chloe Smith, Norwich North
 Julian Smith, Skipton and Ripon
 Nicholas Soames, Mid Sussex
 Caroline Spelman, Meriden
 Mark Spencer, Sherwood
 John Stevenson, Carlisle
 Rory Stewart, Penrith and The Border
 Gary Streeter, South West Devon
 Mel Stride, Central Devon
 Graham Stuart, Beverley and Holderness
 Julian Sturdy, York Outer
 Rishi Sunak, Richmond (Yorks)
 Desmond Swayne, New Forest West
 Hugo Swire, East Devon
 Robert Syms, Poole
 Derek Thomas, St Ives
 Maggie Throup, Erewash
 Kelly Tolhurst, Rochester and Strood
 Justin Tomlinson, North Swindon
 David Tredinnick, Bosworth
 Liz Truss, South West Norfolk
 Tom Tugendhat, Tonbridge and Malling
 Ed Vaizey, Wantage
 Martin Vickers, Cleethorpes
 Charles Walker, Broxbourne
 Robin Walker, Worcester
 Ben Wallace, Wyre and Preston North
 David Warburton, Somerton and Frome
 Matt Warman, Boston and Skegness
 Giles Watling, Clacton
 Helen Whately, Faversham and Mid Kent
 Heather Wheeler, South Derbyshire
 Craig Whittaker, Calder Valley
 Bill Wiggin, North Herefordshire
 Gavin Williamson, South Staffordshire
 Mike Wood, Dudley South
 William Wragg, Hazel Grove
 Jeremy Wright, Kenilworth and Southam
 Nadhim Zahawi, Stratford-on-Avon

 Independent (4)

 Ian Austin, Dudley North
 Frank Field, Birkenhead
 Sylvia Hermon, North Down
 Stephen Lloyd, Eastbourne

 Labour (3)

 Kevin Barron, Rother Valley
 Caroline Flint, Don Valley
 John Mann, Bassetlaw

 Conservative (75)

 Adam Afriyie, Windsor
 Lucy Allan, Telford
 Richard Bacon, South Norfolk
 Steve Baker, Wycombe
 John Baron, Basildon and Billericay
 Guto Bebb, Aberconwy
 Crispin Blunt, Reigate
 Peter Bone, Wellingborough
 Suella Braverman, Fareham
 Andrew Bridgen, North West Leicestershire
 Conor Burns, Bournemouth West
 Bill Cash, Stone
 Rehman Chishti, Gillingham and Rainham
 Christopher Chope, Christchurch
 Simon Clarke, Middlesbrough South and East Cleveland
 Damian Collins, Folkestone and Hythe
 Robert Courts, Witney
 Richard Drax, South Dorset
 James Duddridge, Rochford and Southend East
 Iain Duncan Smith, Chingford and Woodford Green
 Charlie Elphicke, Dover
 Michael Fabricant, Lichfield
 Michael Fallon, Sevenoaks
 Mark Francois, Rayleigh and Wickford
 Marcus Fysh, Yeovil
 James Gray, North Wiltshire
 Chris Green, Bolton West
 Justine Greening, Putney
 Dominic Grieve, Beaconsfield
 Sam Gyimah, East Surrey
 Mark Harper, Forest of Dean
 Gordon Henderson, Sittingbourne and Sheppey
 Philip Hollobone, Kettering
 Adam Holloway, Gravesham
 Eddie Hughes, Walsall North
 Ranil Jayawardena, North East Hampshire
 Bernard Jenkin, Harwich and North Essex
 Andrea Jenkyns, Morley and Outwood
 Boris Johnson, Uxbridge and South Ruislip
 Gareth Johnson, Dartford
 Jo Johnson, Orpington
 David Jones, Clwyd West
 Daniel Kawczynski, Shrewsbury and Atcham
 Pauline Latham, Mid Derbyshire
 Phillip Lee, Bracknell
 Andrew Lewer, Northampton South
 Julian Lewis, New Forest East
 Ian Liddell-Grainger, Bridgwater and West Somerset
 Julia Lopez, Hornchurch and Upminster
 Jonathan Lord, Woking
 Craig Mackinlay, South Thanet
 Anne Main, St Albans
 Esther McVey, Tatton
 Anne Marie Morris, Newton Abbot
 Sheryll Murray, South East Cornwall
 Priti Patel, Witham
 Owen Paterson, North Shropshire
 Tom Pursglove, Corby
 Dominic Raab, Esher and Walton
 John Redwood, Wokingham
 Jacob Rees-Mogg, North East Somerset
 Laurence Robertson, Tewkesbury
 Andrew Rosindell, Romford
 Lee Rowley, North East Derbyshire
 Grant Shapps, Welwyn Hatfield
 Henry Smith, Crawley
 Royston Smith, Southampton Itchen
 Bob Stewart, Beckenham
 Ross Thomson, Aberdeen South
 Michael Tomlinson, Mid Dorset and North Poole
 Craig Tracey, North Warwickshire
 Anne-Marie Trevelyan, Berwick-upon-Tweed
 Shailesh Vara, North West Cambridgeshire
 Theresa Villiers, Chipping Barnet
 John Whittingdale , Maldon

 Democratic Unionist Party (10)

 Gregory Campbell, East Londonderry
 Nigel Dodds, Belfast North
 Jeffrey Donaldson, Lagan Valley
 Paul Girvan, South Antrim
 Emma Little-Pengelly, Belfast South
 Ian Paisley, North Antrim
 Gavin Robinson, Belfast East
 Jim Shannon, Strangford
 David Simpson, Upper Bann
 Sammy Wilson, East Antrim

 Green (1)

 Caroline Lucas, Brighton Pavilion

 Independent (6)

 Kelvin Hopkins, Luton North
 Ivan Lewis, Bury South
 Jared O'Mara, Sheffield Hallam
 Fiona Onasanya, Peterborough
 Chris Williamson, Derby North
 John Woodcock, Barrow and Furness

 The Independent Group (11)

 Heidi Allen, South Cambridgeshire
 Luciana Berger, Liverpool Riverside
 Ann Coffey, Stockport
 Mike Gapes, Ilford South
 Chris Leslie, Nottingham East
 Joan Ryan, Enfield North
 Gavin Shuker, Luton South
 Angela Smith, Penistone and Stocksbridge
 Anna Soubry, Broxtowe
 Chuka Umunna, Streatham
 Sarah Wollaston, Totnes

 Labour (238)

 Diane Abbott, Hackney North and Stoke Newington
 Debbie Abrahams, Oldham East and Saddleworth
 Rushanara Ali, Bethnal Green and Bow
 Rosena Allin-Khan, Tooting
 Mike Amesbury, Weaver Vale
 Tonia Antoniazzi, Gower
 Jon Ashworth, Leicester South
 Adrian Bailey, West Bromwich West
 Margaret Beckett, Derby South
 Hilary Benn, Leeds Central
 Clive Betts, Sheffield South East
 Roberta Blackman-Woods, City of Durham
 Paul Blomfield, Sheffield Central
 Tracy Brabin, Batley and Spen
 Ben Bradshaw, Exeter
 Kevin Brennan, Cardiff West
 Lyn Brown, West Ham
 Nick Brown, Newcastle-upon-Tyne East and Wallsend
 Chris Bryant, Rhondda
 Karen Buck, Westminster North
 Richard Burden, Birmingham Northfield
 Richard Burgon, Leeds East
 Dawn Butler, Brent Central
 Liam Byrne, Birmingham Hodge Hill
 Ruth Cadbury, Brentford and Isleworth
 Alan Campbell, Tynemouth
 Ronnie Campbell, Blyth Valley
 Dan Carden, Liverpool Walton
 Sarah Champion, Rotherham
 Jenny Chapman, Darlington
 Bambos Charalambous, Enfield Southgate
 Ann Clwyd, Cynon Valley
 Vernon Coaker, Gedling
 Julie Cooper, Burnley
 Rosie Cooper, West Lancashire
 Yvette Cooper, Normanton, Pontefract and Castleford
 Jeremy Corbyn, Islington North
 Neil Coyle, Bermondsey and Old Southwark
 David Crausby, Bolton North East
 Mary Creagh, Wakefield
 Stella Creasy, Walthamstow
 Jon Cruddas, Dagenham and Rainham
 John Cryer, Leyton and Wanstead
 Judith Cummins, Bradford South
 Alex Cunningham, Stockton North
 Jim Cunningham, Coventry South
 Janet Daby, Lewisham East
 Wayne David, Caerphilly
 Geraint Davies Swansea West
 Marsha de Cordova, Battersea
 Gloria De Piero, Ashfield
 Emma Dent Coad, Kensington
 Tanmanjeet Singh Dhesi, Slough
 Anneliese Dodds, Oxford East
 Stephen Doughty, Cardiff South and Penarth
 Peter Dowd, Bootle
 David Drew, Stroud
 Jack Dromey, Birmingham Erdington
 Rosie Duffield, Canterbury
 Angela Eagle, Wallasey
 Maria Eagle, Garston and Halewood
 Clive Efford, Eltham
 Julie Elliott, Sunderland Central
 Louise Ellman, Liverpool Riverside
 Chris Elmore, Ogmore
 Bill Esterson, Sefton Central
 Chris Evans, Islwyn
 Paul Farrelly, Newcastle-under-Lyme
 Jim Fitzpatrick Poplar and Limehouse
 Colleen Fletcher, Coventry North East
 Yvonne Fovargue, Makerfield
 Vicky Foxcroft, Lewisham Deptford
 James Frith, Bury North
 Gill Furniss, Sheffield Brightside and Hillsborough
 Hugh Gaffney, Coatbridge, Chryston and Bellshill
 Barry Gardiner, Brent North
 Ruth George, High Peak
 Preet Gill, Birmingham Edgbaston
 Mary Glindon, North Tyneside
 Roger Godsiff, Birmingham Hall Green
 Helen Goodman, Bishop Auckland
 Kate Green, Stretford and Urmston
 Lilian Greenwood, Nottingham South
 Margaret Greenwood, Wirral West
 Nia Griffith, Llanelli
 John Grogan, Keighley
 Andrew Gwynne, Denton and Reddish
 Louise Haigh, Sheffield Heeley
 Fabian Hamilton, Leeds North East
 David Hanson, Delyn
 Emma Hardy, Kingston upon Hull West and Hessle
 Harriet Harman, Camberwell and Peckham
 Carolyn Harris, Swansea East
 Helen Hayes, Dulwich and West Norwood
 Sue Hayman, Workington
 John Healey, Wentworth and Dearne
 Mark Hendrick, Preston
 Stephen Hepburn, Jarrow
 Mike Hill, Hartlepool
 Meg Hillier, Hackney South and Shoreditch
 Margaret Hodge, Barking
 Sharon Hodgson, Washington and Sunderland West
 Kate Hoey, Vauxhall
 Kate Hollern, Blackburn
 George Howarth, Knowsley
 Rupa Huq, Ealing Central and Acton
 Imran Hussain, Bradford East
 Dan Jarvis, Barnsley Central
 Diana Johnson, Kingston upon Hull North
 Darren Jones, Bristol North West
 Gerald Jones, Merthyr Tydfil and Rhymney
 Graham Jones, Hyndburn
 Helen Jones, Warrington North
 Kevan Jones, North Durham
 Sarah Jones, Croydon Central
 Susan Elan Jones, Clwyd South
 Mike Kane, Wythenshawe and Sale East
 Barbara Keeley, Worsley and Eccles South
 Liz Kendall, Leicester West
 Afzal Khan, Manchester Gorton
 Gerard Killen, Rutherglen and Hamilton West
 Stephen Kinnock, Aberavon
 Peter Kyle, Hove
 Lesley Laird, Kirkcaldy and Cowdenbeath
 David Lammy, Tottenham
 Ian Lavery, Wansbeck
 Karen Lee, Lincoln
 Emma Lewell-Buck, South Shields
 Clive Lewis, Norwich South
 Tony Lloyd, Rochdale
 Rebecca Long-Bailey, Salford and Eccles
 Ian Lucas, Wrexham
 Holly Lynch, Halifax
 Justin Madders, Ellesmere Port and Neston
 Khalid Mahmood, Birmingham Perry Barr
 Shabana Mahmood, Birmingham Ladywood
 Seema Malhotra, Feltham and Heston
 Gordon Marsden, Blackpool South
 Sandy Martin, Ipswich
 Rachael Maskell, York Central
 Chris Matheson, City of Chester
 Steve McCabe, Birmingham Selly Oak
 Kerry McCarthy, Bristol East
 Siobhain McDonagh, Mitcham and Morden
 Andy McDonald, Middlesbrough
 John McDonnell, Hayes and Harlington
 Pat McFadden, Wolverhampton South East
 Conor McGinn, St Helens North
 Alison McGovern, Wirral South
 Liz McInnes, Heywood and Middleton
 Catherine McKinnell, Newcastle upon Tyne North
 Jim McMahon, Oldham West and Royton
 Anna McMorrin, Cardiff North
 Ian Mearns, Gateshead
 Ed Miliband, Doncaster North
 Madeleine Moon, Bridgend
 Jessica Morden, Newport East
 Stephen Morgan, Portsmouth South
 Grahame Morris, Easington
 Ian Murray, Edinburgh South
 Lisa Nandy, Wigan
 Alex Norris, Nottingham North
 Melanie Onn, Great Grimsby
 Chi Onwurah, Newcastle upon Tyne Central
 Kate Osamor, Edmonton
 Albert Owen, Ynys Môn
 Stephanie Peacock, Barnsley East
 Teresa Pearce, Erith and Thamesmead
 Matthew Pennycook, Greenwich and Woolwich
 Toby Perkins, Chesterfield
 Jess Phillips, Birmingham Yardley
 Bridget Phillipson, Houghton and Sunderland South
 Laura Pidcock, North West Durham
 Jo Platt, Leigh
 Luke Pollard, Plymouth Sutton and Devonport
 Stephen Pound, Ealing North
 Lucy Powell, Manchester Central
 Yasmin Qureshi, Bolton South East
 Faisal Rashid, Warrington South
 Angela Rayner, Ashton-under-Lyne
 Steve Reed, Croydon North
 Christina Rees, Neath
 Ellie Reeves, Lewisham West and Penge
 Rachel Reeves, Leeds West
 Emma Reynolds, Wolverhampton North East
 Jonathan Reynolds, Stalybridge and Hyde
 Marie Rimmer, St Helens South and Whiston
 Geoffrey Robinson, Coventry North West
 Matt Rodda, Reading East
 Danielle Rowley, Midlothian
 Chris Ruane, Vale of Clwyd
 Lloyd Russell-Moyle, Brighton Kemptown
 Naz Shah, Bradford West
 Virendra Sharma, Ealing Southall
 Barry Sheerman, Huddersfield
 Paula Sherriff, Dewsbury
 Tulip Siddiq, Hampstead and Kilburn
 Dennis Skinner, Bolsover
 Andy Slaughter, Hammersmith
 Ruth Smeeth, Stoke-on-Trent North
 Cat Smith, Lancaster and Fleetwood
 Eleanor Smith, Wolverhampton South West
 Jeff Smith, Manchester Withington
 Laura Smith, Crewe and Nantwich
 Nick Smith, Blaenau Gwent
 Owen Smith, Pontypridd
 Karin Smyth, Bristol South
 Gareth Snell, Stoke-on-Trent Central
 Alex Sobel, Leeds North West
 John Spellar, Birmingham Northfield
 Keir Starmer, Holborn and St Pancras
 Jo Stevens, Cardiff Central
 Wes Streeting, Ilford North
 Graham Stringer, Blackley and Broughton
 Paul Sweeney, Glasgow North East
 Mark Tami, Alyn and Deeside
 Gareth Thomas, Harrow West
 Nick Thomas-Symonds, Torfaen
 Emily Thornberry, Islington South and Finsbury
 Stephen Timms, East Ham
 Jon Trickett, Hemsworth
 Anna Turley, Redcar
 Karl Turner, Kingston upon Hull East
 Derek Twigg, Halton
 Stephen Twigg, Liverpool West Derby
 Liz Twist, Blaydon
 Keith Vaz, Leicester East
 Valerie Vaz, Walsall South
 Thelma Walker, Colne Valley
 Tom Watson, West Bromwich East
 Catherine West, Hornsey and Wood Green
 Matthew Western, Warwick and Leamington
 Alan Whitehead, Southampton Test
 Martin Whitfield East Lothian
 Paul Williams, Stockton South
 Phil Wilson, Sedgefield
 Mohammad Yasin, Bedford
 Daniel Zeichner, Cambridge

 Liberal Democrat (11)

 Tom Brake, Carshalton and Wallington
 Vince Cable, Twickenham
 Alistair Carmichael, Orkney and Shetland
 Ed Davey, Kingston and Surbiton
 Tim Farron, Westmorland and Lonsdale
 Wera Hobhouse, Bath
 Christine Jardine, Edinburgh West
 Norman Lamb, North Norfolk
 Layla Moran, Oxford West and Abingdon
 Jamie Stone, Caithness, Sutherland and Easter Ross
 Jo Swinson, East Dunbartonshire

 Plaid Cymru (4)

 Jonathan Edwards, Carmarthen East and Dinefwr
 Ben Lake, Ceredigion
 Liz Saville Roberts, Dwyfor Meirionnydd
 Hywel Williams, Arfon

 Scottish National Party (35)

 Hannah Bardell, Livingston
 Mhairi Black, Paisley and Renfrewshire South
 Ian Blackford, Ross, Skye and Lochaber 
 Kirsty Blackman, Aberdeen North
 Deidre Brock, Edinburgh North and Leith
 Alan Brown, Kilmarnock and Loudoun
 Lisa Cameron, East Kilbride, Strathaven and Lesmahagow
 Douglas Chapman, Dunfermline and West Fife
 Joanna Cherry, Edinburgh South West
 Ronnie Cowan, Inverclyde
 Angela Crawley, Lanark and Hamilton East
 Martyn Day, Linlithgow and East Falkirk
 Martin Docherty-Hughes, West Dunbartonshire
 Marion Fellows, Motherwell and Wishaw
 Stephen Gethins, North East Fife
 Patricia Gibson, North Ayrshire and Arran
 Patrick Grady, Glasgow North
 Peter Grant, Glenrothes
 Neil Gray, Airdrie and Shotts
 Drew Hendry, Inverness, Nairn, Badenoch and Strathspey
 Stewart Hosie, Dundee East
 Chris Law, Dundee West
 David Linden, Glasgow East
 Angus MacNeil, Na h-Eileanan an Iar
 John McNally, Falkirk
 Stewart McDonald, Glasgow South
 Stuart McDonald, Cumbernauld, Kilsyth and Kirkintilloch East
 Carol Monaghan, Glasgow North West
 Gavin Newlands, Paisley and Renfrewshire North
 Brendan O'Hara, Argyll and Bute
 Tommy Sheppard, Edinburgh East
 Chris Stephens, Glasgow South West
 Alison Thewliss, Glasgow Central
 Philippa Whitford, Central Ayrshire
 Pete Wishart, Perth and North Perthshire

 Conservative (1)

 Douglas Ross, Moray (due to the birth of his child)

Vote on "no deal" (13 March 2019) 

Under the terms of the 27 February motion, the defeat of the second meaningful vote means that the Government must promptly bring forward a motion regarding leaving the European Union without a withdrawal agreement. The motion, which blocked a no-deal Brexit, was presented on 13 March. Two amendments to the motion were voted upon: the first, tabled by Caroline Spelman and categorically rejecting no-deal in any circumstances, passed 312–308; the second, the "Malthouse compromise" supporting a so-called "managed no-deal Brexit", failed 164–374.

Vote on extending Article 50 (14 March 2019) 
As leaving the European Union without a deal was rejected, then the Government was required to bring to 14 March sitting a motion regarding extending Article 50 past 29 March.

The motion as tabled by the Government states that if the Withdrawal Agreement had not been ratified by 20 March, then the Government would seek an extension of Article 50 to 30 June, the last possible day that Brexit could take place without requiring British participation in May's European elections.

Four amendments were selected for debate alongside the motion:
 Amendment (h) tabled by Sarah Wollaston that removes the 30 June deadline and instructs the government to seek an extension to enable a second referendum was rejected by 85–334. 
 Amendment (i) tabled by Hilary Benn that calls for an Article 50 extension and allows backbenchers to set the business of the House on 20 March 2019 was rejected by 312–314.
 An amendment to the amendment tabled by Lucy Powell, which set the Article 50 extension to 30 June, was rejected by 311–314.
 Amendment (e) tabled by the Labour leadership that removes the 30 June deadline and instructs the government to enable a different approach to negotiations was rejected by 302–318.
 Amendment (j) tabled by Chris Bryant that prevents a third meaningful vote was not moved to a vote.

The main motion was approved by 412–202.

Vote on first Letwin amendment and Beckett amendment (25 March 2019) 
Tabled by Oliver Letwin, the amendment passed 329–302 and required the Commons to hold a series of indicative votes on 27 March.  Three ministers resigned from the government to support the amendment: Richard Harrington (business minister), Alistair Burt (foreign office), and Steve Brine (health). The Beckett amendment, tabled by Margaret Beckett, was defeated 314–311. It would have required Parliament to vote favourably for a "no deal" Brexit or request an extension to Article 50 if the government was within seven days of leaving the European Union without a deal.  The amended main motion (Letwin but not Beckett) passed 327–300.

First Round of Indicative Votes (27 March 2019) 
As a result of the first Letwin amendment's success, indicative votes on Parliament's preferred Brexit options were held on 27 March.  Eight propositions were voted upon, of which all eight failed.

In a departure from Westminster parliamentary convention, all eight votes took place simultaneously, using ballot papers, rather than having MPs walk through lobbies to signify their vote.

Third "meaningful vote" (29 March 2019) 
As parliament had agreed to an extension of Article 50 to 30 June the possibility of a third meaningful vote was raised and the Speaker ruled that "the same proposition or substantially the same proposition" could not be brought back in the same parliamentary session. The Political Declaration was then removed from the ballot in order to make it a different proposition.

The third vote meaningful vote on the Withdrawal Agreement was then able to take place on 29 March 2019. May promised to resign as Prime Minister if the Withdrawal Agreement was passed. In the end, May's deal was voted down again, albeit by a smaller margin than in the previous two votes.

Second Round of Indicative Votes (1 April 2019)
Further indicative votes were held on 1 April on propositions chosen by the Speaker.

Once again, in a departure from parliamentary convention, rather than having MPs walk through lobbies to indicate their vote choice, all four votes took place simultaneously using ballot papers.

Cooper–Letwin Bill (3 April 2019) 

Since none of the tabled propositions in the second round of indicative votes could command a majority in the House of Commons, a third round of indicative votes was planned to be held on 3 April. On the day of 3 April 2019, the House of Commons focused instead on debating the "European Union (Withdrawal) (No. 5) Bill". This bill was otherwise known as the Cooper–Letwin Bill, after its chief sponsors Yvette Cooper (Labour) and Oliver Letwin (Conservative). The bill places an obligation on the Government to seek consent for any or no extensions to the date of withdrawal from the EU. To do so, the House of Commons first debated a business of the House motion to allow the Bill to be brought in for debate on that day. There was one proposed amendment to the Business of the House motion, which would have sought to schedule more indicative votes for 8 April 2019; this failed in the first tied vote since 1993.

The tie was broken by the Speaker in favour of "No" (in accordance with Speaker Denison's rule), meaning the motion was rejected. The lack of passage of this motion meant that no further indicative votes would be scheduled by the House of Commons to be held on 8 April 2019.

After losing the third vote and the approval of the Cooper–Letwin Bill at the third reading by 313–312, May and her cabinet considered the possibility of bringing the withdrawal agreement back to parliament for a fourth vote. In mid-May, May said that she would bring the withdrawal agreement to the parliament in the first week on June. Due to huge opposition to the new agreement, May postponed the publication from 24 May to 4 June, and subsequently resigned as prime minister.

Prorogation of parliament

Boris Johnson, elected Conservative Party leader in July, and invited by the Queen to become Prime Minister, announced on 28 August that he had requested the Queen to prorogue Parliament from between 9 September and 12 September until the beginning of a new session on 14 October. On the advice of the (minimally quorate) Privy Council and in accordance with constitutional convention, the Queen granted this request the same day.

Benn Bill (4 September 2019)

Once Parliament reconvened from summer recess, Labour MP Hilary Benn presented a bill that would rule out a unilateral no-deal Brexit by forcing the Government to reach an Agreement, get parliamentary approval for no-deal Brexit, or, if neither condition is fulfilled by 19 October, then extend the deadline until 31 January 2020.

On 3 September, Oliver Letwin submitted a motion for an emergency debate on this bill, in accordance with Standing Order No. 24. This motion, to allow the debate for the following day, passed, 328 to 301. 21 Conservative MPs voted for the motion and were then removed from the Conservative whip and deselected for future elections, as Johnson had threatened to do in advance. The 21 MPs were Guto Bebb, Richard Benyon, Steve Brine, Alastair Burt, Greg Clark, Ken Clarke, David Gauke, Justine Greening, Dominic Grieve, Sam Gyimah, Phillip Hammond, Stephen Hammond, Richard Harrington, Margot James, Letwin, Anne Milton, Caroline Nokes, Antoinette Sandbach, Nicholas Soames, Rory Stewart and Ed Vaizey. This, combined with Phillip Lee’s defection to the Liberal Democrats earlier that day, gave the Opposition a 43-seat majority over the Government.

Johnson further announced his intention to seek an early general election. Under the Fixed-Term Parliaments Act, a two-thirds majority of the House of Commons is necessary for this motion to pass, but opposition leaders indicated that they would refuse support until after Benn’s bill is passed.

On 4 September, the Benn Bill passed second reading by 329 to 300; a 22nd Conservative, Caroline Spelman, voted against the Government position. Later the same day MPs subsequently rejected Johnson's motion to call an October general election, failing to achieve the two-thirds Commons majority needed under the Fixed-term Parliaments Act, in a vote of 298 to 56. Labour MPs abstained from the vote.

On 9 September, the Benn Bill was granted royal assent. On the same day, MPs backed a motion calling for the publication of all government communications relating to no-deal Brexit planning and the suspension of Parliament, voting 311 to 302. A second government motion calling for an early general election failed to achieve the required super-majority, with 293 MPs voting in favour of it. Parliament was then prorogued until 14 October. The prorogation was subsequently overturned on 24 September following legal challenges against the government, and parliament reconvened the following day, with a shorter prorogation then taking place for six days, from 8 to 14 October.

Second Letwin amendment (19 October 2019) 
Following further negotiations between the UK and EU, a revised withdrawal agreement was reached on 17 October. A special Saturday sitting of Parliament was held two days later to debate the new agreement. MPs passed the second Letwin amendment 322 to 306, which withheld Parliament's approval until legislation implementing the deal has been passed, and forced the Government to request the EU for a delay to Brexit until 31 January 2020. The amended motion was then passed by MPs without a vote as the Government effectively accepted defeat. On 21 October the Speaker of the House of Commons John Bercow refused a government request to hold a vote on the Brexit deal, citing their previous decision to withdraw it.

On the evening of 19 October, 10 Downing Street confirmed that Boris Johnson would send a letter to the EU requesting an extension, but would not sign it. EU Council President Donald Tusk subsequently confirmed receipt of the letter, which Johnson had described as "Parliament's letter, not my letter". In addition, Johnson sent a second letter expressing the view that any further delay to Brexit would be a mistake.

Withdrawal Agreement Debate (22 October 2019) 
On 21 October, the government published the Withdrawal Agreement Bill and proposed three days of debate for opposition MPs to scrutinise it. The government brought the recently revised EU Withdrawal Bill to the House of Commons for debate on the evening of 22 October 2019. MPs voted to give the Bill a second reading which was passed by 329 votes to 299, and the timetable for debating the Bill, which was defeated by 322 votes to 308. Prior to the votes, Johnson had stated that if his timetable failed to generate the support needed to pass in parliament he would abandon attempts to get the deal approved and would seek a general election. Following the vote Johnson announced that the legislation would be paused while he consulted with other EU leaders.

Technical Withdrawal Amendments (23 October 2019) 
On 23 October, the House of Commons debated three technical pieces of legislation relating to the UK's withdrawal from the EU. The legislation debate addressed the repeal of certain technical provisions enshrined in UK law regarding the EU. Were the vote to pass for these three acts they would only come into effect if the UK were to ultimately leave the EU. The three items debated dealt with amendments to existing UK law in order to repeal 1) the freedom of movement provisions of the EU 2) regulatory oversight of the UK by third party (EU) countries 3) regulations on financial services codified by the EU. All three amendments went to a division vote, and all three passed the House of Commons vote.

Votes during the 58th Parliament of the United Kingdom (2019–24)

Withdrawal Agreement Bill Debate  & Second Reading (20 December 2019) 
On 20 December 2019, immediately after the state opening of Parliament following the 2019 United Kingdom general election (in which the Conservative Party secured a large majority of 80 seats), the Government presented another Bill to ratify its draft withdrawal agreement. It also proposed another guillotine motion to curtail debate on the Bill.

Amendment Debate & Third Reading (9 January 2020) 

Afterwards, a proposed amendment by Ian Blackford to fail Third Reading was defeated by 62 ayes to 329 noes, and the Reading itself passed by 330–231.

Further reading

Notes

References

External links 
 Bill stages — European Union (Withdrawal) Bill 2017-19, UK Parliament

2018 in British politics
2018 in law
2018 in the United Kingdom
Activism
Brexit
Laws in the United Kingdom
Consequences of the 2016 United Kingdom European Union membership referendum
United Kingdom and the European Union
Withdrawal from the European Union